Shannon Farnon (born November 28, 1941) is a Canadian actress. She is best known as being the first actress to voice Wonder Woman in a Hanna-Barbera production, having voiced her in Super Friends from 1973 to 1983.

Early life
Born into a show business family, she is the daughter of Brian Farnon, a musician and conductor, and Rita Oehmen, a singer and actress, and sister of Charmian Carr and Darleen Carr. She was raised in Chicago, Illinois.

Farnon majored in Theatre Arts in Los Angeles and a couple years later worked in many areas of the entertainment business.field. She graduated from Los Angeles Valley College in 1962.

Career
Farnon starred in film, television, commercials and cartoons, however her first role was in 1965 in an uncredited role on Burke's Law. She went on to appear in multiple other television series, but was most active in commercials. In 1967, she appeared in an episode of I Dream of Jeannie as Major Nelson's date, selected by Jeannie with the use of a "computer machine" at a dating club, and in March, 1970, she was in an episode of Dragnet ("Night School"), where she played a fellow student attending a college course with Joe Friday (played by the show's, creator, producer and star, Jack Webb).  While playing a mother in a live-action commercial in 1973 for Flintstone vitamins, she was approached by voice director Wally Burr to audition for what was to be her most long-running famous role, Wonder Woman on Super Friends.

From 1973 to 1983, Farnon voiced the Amazonian superheroine on Super Friends, Challenge of the Super Friends, The All-New Super Friends Hour, The World's Greatest Super Friends and the revival of Super Friends. Farnon did voice several incidental characters, such as Lois Lane and Hawkgirl on some of the series and also played Kim Butler in Valley of the Dinosaurs in 1974, but mainly she did the voice of Wonder Woman. She made a guest appearance in the television show Emergency! (1977 S6E21 “Limelight”) as Mrs. Robinson.

However, in 1984, her prominent character was recast in Super Friends: The Legendary Super Powers Show, when the role was given to Constance Cawlfield and later to B.J. Ward. This case has often been given as an example of injustice in the television and animation industry. Mary McDonald-Lewis voiced Wonder Woman in an episode of Superman.

She voiced Wonder Woman on many Cartoon Network promos and went on to appear in several films and television series, but since 2005, her acting appearances have been infrequent. She has voiced various commercials, including Betty Crocker, Nivea, Kodak, National World War II Memorial, Oil of Olay, Scotchgard and Cartoon Network spoofs of The Super Friends.

Personal life
She was married to William Wells from 1966 to 1975 (married twice after that) and had twins, Jeremy and Julie, born in 1971. Jeremy died from a skiing accident at the age 24. This info can be found in her sister Charmian's book, Forever Liesl.

References

External links

Toon Zone News Shannon Farnon the Super Friends Wonder Woman

1941 births
Living people
Actresses from Toronto
Canadian film actresses
Canadian television actresses
Canadian voice actresses
Hanna-Barbera people
20th-century Canadian actresses
21st-century Canadian actresses